Varnian (also Romanized as Vārnīān and Vārneyān; also known as Vārīnān) is a village in Jolgeh Rural District, in the Central District of Golpayegan County, Isfahan Province, Iran. At the 2006 census, its population was 107, in 35 families.

References 

Populated places in Golpayegan County